Jack Read (birth unknown – death unknown) was an English rugby union and professional rugby league footballer who played in the 1920s, 1930s and 1940s.

Playing career

Challenge Final appearances
Jack Read played in Oldham's 3-9 defeat by Swinton in the 1926 Challenge Cup Final during the 1925-26 season at Spotland Stadium, Rochdale, and played in the 26-7 victory over Swinton in the 1927 Challenge Cup Final during the 1926-27 season at Central Park, Wigan.

Club career
Jack Read made his début for Oldham against Hull FC on Friday 1 January 1926.

Career records
Jack Read is second on Oldham's all-time appearance list with 463 appearances, he is second to Joe Ferguson who has 627 appearances.

Honoured at Oldham
Jack Read is an Oldham Hall Of Fame Inductee.

References

External links

Search for "Read" at en.espn.co.uk
Search for "Read" at rugbyleagueproject.org
Statistics at orl-heritagetrust.org.uk

English rugby league players
English rugby union players
Gloucestershire County RFU players
Oldham R.L.F.C. players
Rugby league props
Rugby league players from Gloucestershire
Rugby League XIII players
Rugby union players from Gloucester